University street  is a street in central Donetsk, Ukraine. It is located in the city's Kyivskyi Raion  and Voroshylovskyi Raion.

Gallery

References

Streets in Donetsk